This is a list of fictional countries supposedly located somewhere in the continent of Asia.

Central Asia
 Kuala Rokat: a far eastern country in the Mission: Impossible TV episode "The Seal". Described in the tape sequence at the start of the episode as "a small but strategic nation on the India-China border".
 Tajinkistan: Central Asian country from Lol:-)
 Takistan: a country in Central Asia, from the computer game ArmA II: Operation Arrowhead.
 Tazbekistan: Central Asian republic, setting for the 2013 BBC TV comedy series Ambassadors (Also on MI5 (Spooks); Series 10, Episode 6) .

East Asia
 Eastasia: One of the countries in the 1949 dystopian novel Nineteen Eighty-Four. The nation is stated to consist of "China and the countries south to it, the Japanese islands, and a large but fluctuating portion of Manchuria, Mongolia and Tibet."
 Glubbdubdrib: An island of sorcerers and necromancers located near Japan in Gulliver's Travels. 
 Greater Korean Republic: A fictional empire in Homefront which initially started off as a unified Korean Republic under Kim Jong-un, who managed to reunify the Koreas peacefully. It was established in 2015, after conquering Japan, the Philippines, and all of Southeast Asia and Western America.
 Hun Chiu: A parody of Korea in Designated Survivor, which is divided into the democratic West Hun Chiu, which is a US ally and led by President Han, and the totalitarian East Hun Chiu, which is led by the tyrannical Chairman Kim.
 Luggnagg: An island of miserable immortals located near Japan in Gulliver's Travels.
 Shangri-la: A small, peaceful kingdom in the western Himalayan Mountains featured in the 1933 novel Lost Horizon.
 Yul: A fictional kingdom in Hong Gildong jeon whose king was overthrown by the titular character, and ruled under said character's benevolent government.

South Asia
 Khalnikstan: A fictional country located in south Pakistan, Created by Kymani, Khalnikstan has gone through 2 civil wars, one for the end of monarchy, And the other for facism, The first one succeeded, While the other failed, More details are still in the progress of being made today.
 Felistia: A communist monarchy in the Dead or Alive video game series.
 Helmajistan: A fictional South Asian country, based Afghanistan featured in the Japanese anime television series Full Metal Panic!. 
 Jalpur: A fictional Indian kingdom in the computer-animated television series Mira, Royal Detective.
 Khura'in: A deeply-religious kingdom located in the western edge of the Far East or near Nepal in Phoenix Wright: Ace Attorney − Spirit of Justice.
 Kumsa: A country bordering the west of Kyrat in Far Cry 4 
 Kyrat: An unstable monarchy located between Nepal and India from Far Cry 4.
 Lugash: A mountain kingdom located somewhere near India from the Pink Panther films.
 Mahishmati/Magizhmathi: An ancient kingdom located in India from the Baahubali films based on the historical Mahishmati
 Papir Republic: A country that borders the south of Kyrat in Far Cry 4
 Thulahn: A very poor kingdom in the Himalayas based on Bhutan in the Iain Banks novel The Business. The novel's protagonist, Kate Telman, is an executive of a millennia-old, benevolent, democratic but secretive commercial organisation known only as "the Business" and is in talks with Thulahnese crown prince, Suvinder Dzung, to allow the Business to purchase Thulahn so it can gain a seat in the United Nations.
 Yangdon: A kingdom based on Bhutan which serves as a major setting of the Philippine television drama Princess and I.
 Yinke: A country that borders the east of Kyrat in Far Cry 4

Southeast Asia
 Bandiaterra: Popular April fools joke by Geography Now
 Bultan: A country in Designated Survivor that has a very strict legal system and is led by a Prime Minister. Relations with the US are tense due to an American youth being sentenced to a harsh punishment and the unexpected death of the Bultanese ambassador.
 Dacan: A country featured in a Ministry of Defence Education Outreach Programme workshop. In the background to the scenario presented during the workshop, Dacan is described as being an oil-rich country which was once a British colony and is currently a member of the Commonwealth; at the beginning of the scenario proper, the government of Dacan orders the arrest of the leadership of a political party that seeks independence for the country's Chiswan province. The fallout from the arrests leads to a civil war breaking out, with the resulting closure of Dacan's airports and borders meaning that foreign nationals are stranded in the country; these include British nationals who are involved with Dacan's oil industry. The unrest, combined with a humanitarian situation stemming from a poor harvest, means that Dacan is faced with a major crisis that must be responded to by those participating in the workshop.
 Nidan Island: An island lying off the southeastern coast of Dacan which features a Royal Air Force base.
 Kumandra: The main setting for Raya and the Last Dragon. Where humans & dragons once lived together in harmony. It is heavily inspired by Southeast Asia countries. To conduct research, the filmmakers and the production team traveled to Laos, Cambodia, Thailand, Vietnam, Singapore, Indonesia and the Philippines. 
Madripoor: An island principality located between Singapore and Indonesia, featured in Marvel Comics.
 Mawan: A country featured in the same Ministry of Defence workshop as Dacan, described as having a land border with that country. During the scenario presented in the workshop, Mawan closes its border with Dacan in response to the unfolding crisis in that country, exacerbating the issue of foreign nationals who are stranded in Dacan.
 Pagaan: A fictional country between Thailand and Malaysia that functions as the setting of the TV series Embassy.
 Panau: A fictional island dictatorship in Just Cause 2.
 Phaic Tăn: A fictional country in Indochina, featured in the parody travel book of the same name.
 Rook Islands: An archipelago located somewhere near Indonesia featured in the video game Far Cry 3.
 Sarkhan: A country analogous to Vietnam in the novel The Ugly American. It is the location of a war between the United States and Communist insurgents.
 Siando: A country featured in the same Ministry of Defence workshop as Dacan, lying off the southwestern coast of that country.
 Southeast Asia Union (SEAUn): A superstate in Southeast Asia which served as the primary setting of the Japanese anime film Psycho-Pass: The Movie.
 Sunda: in Eric Ambler's State of Siege, is similar to Indonesia but much smaller, confined to a single island. (In reality there is a Sunda Strait and many islands known collectively as the Sunda Islands, but no specific one island with the name.)
 Sovonthak: April fools joke by Geography now, Formerly called Vascodam Republic
 Tuluwan: A country featured in the same Ministry of Defence workshop as Dacan, lying to the southeast of that country. Tuluwan is described as being subject to a United Nations peacekeeping mission at the time of the scenario presented during the workshop, with the peacekeeping force consisting of British, French, and Turkish forces.
 Udon Khai: a country featured in Andrew Vachss's 1995 Batman novel Batman: The Ultimate Evil. Bordering Thailand, Udon Khai is a haven for wealthy sex tourists looking for child prostitutes. The country serves as a stand-in for Thailand and as a critique of Thailand's child sex industry.

Southwest Asia
 Agrabah: A fictional Middle Eastern sultanate which serves as a main setting in the 1992 Disney animated film Aladdin.
 Bialya: A fictional Middle Eastern country from DC Comics.
Endostan: A Middle Eastern sultanate which appears in an episode of the Canadian action-adventure series Relic Hunter.
Hobeika and Salmaah: Two warring Middle Eastern sultanates which appear in the French-British movie Day of the Falcon.
Kamistan: From the TV series 24.
Khemed: A fictional emirate from The Adventures of Tintin.
Philistinia: A fictional Philistine state lasting to the present day, from Harry Turtledove's short story Occupation Duty.
Qumar: A fictional Middle Eastern country from The West Wing.
Qurac: A fictional Middle Eastern country from DC Comics located at the Arabian side of the Persian Gulf.
 Unaudited Arab Emirates: Parody of the United Arab Emirates featured in San Sombrèro: A Land of Carnivals, Cocktails and Coups.
Yewaire: A fictional Middle Eastern country from the movie Operation Red Sea.

Uncertain
 Tyranistan: An Asian country and former member of the Soviet Union featured in San Sombrèro: A Land of Carnivals, Cocktails and Coups.
Turmezistan: An Asian country and location of a UN base featured occasionally in seasons 9 and 10 of Doctor Who.
Zheng Fa: A small Asian country mentioned in Ace Attorney Investigations: Miles Edgeworth and Ace Attorney Investigations 2

Western Asia
Vigoor Empire: An imperialistic and landlocked nation in Ninja Gaiden (2004).

References

Asia